The Women's Belgian Hockey League is the top women's league competition for field hockey clubs in Belgium. The league is played since the 1921–22 season.

Gantoise are the most recent champions having won their third title in the 2020–21 season.

Format
The season usually starts in September and ends around the end of April or the beginning of May. From the 2021–22 season onwards the league is played by twelve teams who play each other twice and who compete for four spots in the championship play-offs. The number one and four and the number two and three play each other in the semi-final and the winners qualify for the final where the winner will be crowned champion. The last two teams are relegated to the National 1 and the tenth placed team plays a relegation play-off against the third-placed team in the second division.

Teams

Number of teams by province

List of champions

By club

See also
Men's Belgian Hockey League

References

Hockey
Belgian Hockey League
Belgium
1921 establishments in Belgium
Sports leagues established in 1921